
There are 23 national parks in Poland. These were formerly run by the Polish Board of National Parks (Polish: Krajowy Zarząd Parków Narodowych), but in 2004 responsibility for them was transferred to the Ministry of the Environment. Most national parks are divided into strictly and partially protected zones. Additionally, they are usually surrounded by a protective buffer zone called otulina.

In Poland, as amended by the Nature Conservation Act, 2004, a national park "covers an area of outstanding environmental, scientific, social, cultural and educational value, with an area of not less than 1000 ha, which protects the whole of the nature and qualities of the landscape. A national park is created to preserve biodiversity, resources, objects and elements of inanimate nature and landscape values, to restore the proper state of natural resources and components and to reconstruct distorted natural habitats, plants, habitats of animals and habitats of fungi."

The area of a national park is divided into different zones using separate methods of conservation. There are strict protection zones, as well as active and landscape-related ones.

The areas bordering national parks have been designated as buffer zones. The buffer zone can include protective areas of game animals, in which hunting is not permitted. National parks are available to visit, but only in designated areas, and along specific trails, roads, and paths.

National Parks of Poland are funded from the central budget. They are managed by the directors, as an advisory body to the council of the park. On April 30, 2004 parks were supervised by the National Board of National Parks. From 1 May 2004, the duties were taken over by the Ministry of the Environment - Department of Forestry, Nature Conservation and Landscape and since January 19, 2007 by the Independent Department for Natura 2000 Areas and National Parks. After the establishment of GDOŚ and RDOŚ on October 15, 2008, the supervision of the parks is exercised by the Conservation Department of the Ministry of the Environment.

The Polish national parks have carried out numerous research programs and they play an important role in the ecological education of the society. The national parks can be visited as they provide a well-developed tourism infrastructure. Many of them offer specially prepared trails, educational centres and natural history museums.

Museums in national parks
 Museum of Nature and Forest Białowieża National Park, Palace Park, Białowieża
 Educational Centre of Babia Góra National Park, Zawoja
 Museum of Natural History Bieszczady National Park, Ustrzyki Dolne
 Museum of Natural History Kampinos National Park, Kampinos
 Science Museum at Karkonosze National Park, Jelenia Góra
 Museum im. prof. Władysława Szafera, Ojców
 Centre for Education and Museum at Polesie National Park, Załucze Stare
 Centre for Education and Museum at Roztocze National Park, Zwierzyniec
 Museum of Nature and Forest at Słowiński National Park, Smołdzino
 Museum of Natural History at Świętokrzyski National Park, Święty Krzyż
 Natural History Museum of Tatra National Park, Zakopane
 Natural History Museum of Wielkopolska National Park, Jeziory
 Wigler Museum (Museum at Wigry National Park), Stary Folwark
 Natural History Museum of Wolin National Park, Misdroy
 Field Station DNP "Bogdanka", Drawno
 Karkonosze Environmental Education Center, Szklarska Poręba

See also
 List of Biosphere Reserves in Poland
 List of Landscape Parks of Poland

References

Sources

Legal documents 
Ordinances issued by the Polish Council of Ministers, establishing individual national parks (all in Polish, in PDF format).

 Rozporządzenie Rady Ministrów z dnia 30 października 1954 r. w sprawie utworzenia Babiogórskiego Parku Narodowego, 
 Rozporządzenie Rady Ministrów z dnia 8 sierpnia 1997 r. w sprawie Babiogórskiego Parku Narodowego, 
 Rozporządzenie Rady Ministrów z dnia 21 listopada 1947 r. o utworzeniu Białowieskiego Parku Narodowego, 
 Rozporządzenie Rady Ministrów z dnia 16 lipca 1996 r. w sprawie Białowieskiego Parku Narodowego, 
 Rozporządzenie Rady Ministrów z dnia 9 września 1993 r. w sprawie utworzenia Biebrzańskiego Parku Narodowego, Dz.U. 1993 nr 86 poz. 399
 Rozporządzenie Rady Ministrów z dnia 4 sierpnia 1973 r. w sprawie utworzenia Bieszczadzkiego Parku Narodowego, 
 Rozporządzenie Rady Ministrów z dnia 14 maja 1996 r. w sprawie utworzenia Parku Narodowego "Bory Tucholskie", 
 Rozporządzenie Rady Ministrów z dnia 10 kwietnia 1990 r. w sprawie utworzenia Drawieńskiego Parku Narodowego, 
 Rozporządzenie Rady Ministrów z dnia 8 sierpnia 1980 r. w sprawie utworzenia Gorczańskiego Parku Narodowego, 
 Rozporządzenie Rady Ministrów z dnia 16 września 1993 r. w sprawie utworzenia Parku Narodowego Gór Stołowych, 
 Rozporządzenie Rady Ministrów z dnia 16 stycznia 1959 r. w sprawie utworzenia Kampinoskiego Parku Narodowego, 
 Rozporządzenie Rady Ministrów z dnia 16 stycznia 1959 r. w sprawie utworzenia Karkonoskiego Parku Narodowego, 
 Rozporządzenie Rady Ministrów z dnia 24 listopada 1994 r. w sprawie utworzenia Magurskiego Parku Narodowego, 
 Rozporządzenie Rady Ministrów z dnia 1 lipca 1996 r. w sprawie utworzenia Narwiańskiego Parku Narodowego, 
 Rozporządzenie Rady Ministrów z dnia 14 stycznia 1956 r. w sprawie utworzenia Ojcowskiego Parku Narodowego, 
 Rozporządzenie Rady Ministrów z dnia 30 października 1954 r. w sprawie utworzenia Pienińskiego Parku Narodowego, 
 Rozporządzenie Rady Ministrów z dnia 10 kwietnia 1990 r. w sprawie utworzenia Poleskiego Parku Narodowego, 
 Rozporządzenie Rady Ministrów z dnia 10 maja 1974 r. w sprawie utworzenia Roztoczańskiego Parku Narodowego, 
 Rozporządzenie Rady Ministrów z dnia 23 września 1966 r. w sprawie utworzenia Słowińskiego Parku Narodowego, 
 Rozporządzenie Rady Ministrów z dnia 1 kwietnia 1950 r. w sprawie utworzenia Świętokrzyskiego Parku Narodowego, 
 Rozporządzenie Rady Ministrów z dnia 30 października 1954 r. w sprawie utworzenia Tatrzańskiego Parku Narodowego, 
 Rozporządzenie Rady Ministrów z dnia 19 czerwca 2001 r. w sprawie utworzenia Parku Narodowego "Ujście Warty", 
 Rozporządzenie Rady Ministrów z dnia 16 kwietnia 1957 r. w sprawie utworzenia Wielkopolskiego Parku Narodowego, 
 Rozporządzenie Rady Ministrów z dnia 27 czerwca 1988 r. w sprawie utworzenia Wigierskiego Parku Narodowego, 
 Rozporządzenie Rady Ministrów z dnia 3 marca 1960 r. w sprawie utworzenia Wolińskiego Parku Narodowego,

Websites 
Official websites of individual national parks
 bgpn.pl, Babiogórski Park Narodowy
 bpn.com.pl, Białowieski Park Narodowy
 biebrza.org.pl, Biebrzański Park Narodowy
 bdpn.p, Bieszczadzki Park Narodowy
 park.borytucholskie.info, Park Narodowy Bory Tucholskie
 dpn.pl, Drawieński Park Narodowy
 gorczanskipark.pl, Gorczański Park Narodowy
 pngs.pulsar.net.pl, Park Narodowy Gór Stołowych
 kampinoski-pn.gov.pl, Kampinoski Park Narodowy
 kpnmab.pl, Karkonoski Park Narodowy
 magurskipn.pl, Magurski Park Narodowy
 npn.pl, Narwiański Park Narodowy
 opn.pan.krakow.pl, Ojcowski Park Narodowy
 pieninypn.pl, Pieniński Park Narodowy
 poleskipn.pl, Poleski Park Narodowy
 roztoczanskipn.pl, Roztoczański Park Narodowy
 slowinskipn.pl, Słowiński Park Narodowy
 swietokrzyskipn.org.pl, Świętokrzyski Park Narodowy
 tpn.pl, Tatrzański Park Narodowy
 pnujsciewarty.gov.pl, Park Narodowy Ujście Warty
 wielkopolskipn.pl, Wielkopolski Park Narodowy
 wigry.win.pl, Wigierski Park Narodowy
 wolinpn.pl, Woliński Park Narodowy

External links
 Polish National Parks
 National Parks in Poland

 
Poland
National parks
National parks